General Engineering & Dry Dock Company was a shipbuilding and ship repair company in Alameda, California that was active from the 1920s through the 1940s. The company built ships for the Southern Pacific Railroad and the United States Coast Guard in the late 1920s and early 1930s and took part in the World War II shipbuilding boom, making diesel-propelled steel hulled auxiliaries for the United States Navy, primarily oceangoing minesweepers.

History

At the beginning of World War II, the U.S.Navy started the program for expand the navy. The U.S.Navy used two separate shipbuilding and shiprepair sites to create the Naval Industrial Reserve Shipyard (NIRS) Alameda. The first was the General Engineering and Dry Dock Company. The company worked under contract NObs-344 and built small warships for the U.S. Navy. The shipyard had four shipbuilding ways, which were designed for the simultaneous construction of several ships. In 1946, the U.S. Navy ceased contract with company. The second portion of the Site was to the east of the shipbuilding company. It was purchased from March 24 to July 7, 1942.

General Engineering & Dry Dock Company shipbuilding company started in Oakland, California. To support the World War II demand for ships General Engineering built: minesweepers and Net laying ships. General Engineering was opened in 1919 as Barnes & Tibbitts shipyard by J. D. Barnes and W. G. Tibbitts. Mr. Barnes sold his interest to Tibbitts in 1922 and changed the company name to General Engineering & Dry Dock Company. Tibbitts purchased Hanlon Dry Dock and Shipbuilding in Oakland in 1928. By 1940 the site of the old Hanlon yard (foot of 5th Ave) was occupied by Hurley Marine Shipyard, but in 1933 it had still belonged to General Engineering. After World War II, the shipyards closed in 1948. The shipyard was located at 1805 Clement Ave, Alameda, California. The site is now the Alameda Marina and Island Yacht Club.

Office, machine shop and general repairs at 1100 Sansome Street, San Francisco. 

On 14 March 1918 the Barnes and Tibbitts Shipbuilding and Dry Dock Co. was incorporated in California.

On 1 November 1922 the General Engineering and Dry Dock Company was incorporated in California.

On 11 March 1946 the General Engineering and Dry Dock Corporation was incorporated in Delaware.

Notable ships built 
1920s
 Five ferries for the Golden Gate Ferry Company
 Golden State Yard#1
 Golden Bear #3, launched 2 February 1927
 Golden Poppy #4, diesel-electric ferry launched 2 April 1927
 Golden Shore #5. diesel-electric ferry launched 30 April 1927
 Golden Age #12 diesel-electric ferry launched 21 January 1928
 1 of 6  ferries
  #6 for Northwestern Pacific Railroad, launched 17 March 1927

 Catherine Paladini, 78ft, 200hp Atlas diesel wooden trawler delivered August 1928

1930s
 s (Oakland yard, contract ca. April 1929)
 
 
 
 
1940s (World War II)
 General Engineering placed unsuccessful bids on C1 cargo ships in 1939
 4 of 32 s (Yard #39 ... #42)
 16 of 95 s (#43 .. #58)
 
 7 of 123 s (#59 ... #65)

In the press

See also
California during World War II
Maritime history of California
List of ships built in Alameda, California
Moore Dry Dock Company#Shipbuilding in Oakland and Alameda

References 

 

Defunct shipbuilding companies of the United States
Companies based in Alameda, California